WCLW (1130 AM) is a radio station broadcasting a Southern Gospel format. Licensed to Eden, North Carolina, United States, it serves the Eden area.  The station is currently owned by Reidsvile Baptist Church. The station first signed on August 16, 1970 as WCBX. It was put on the air by Radio Eden Inc. with Ray A. Childers as president and general manager. The studios were located in a building on Kings Highway in Eden, with the transmitter north of the city.<1971 Broadcasting Yearbook>

External links

Radio stations established in 1970
1970 establishments in North Carolina
Southern Gospel radio stations in the United States
CLW
CLW